Fryburg is an unincorporated community in Billings County, North Dakota, United States. The Fryburg oil field is located here.

Fryburg was named for one General Fry of the United States Army.

References

Unincorporated communities in North Dakota
Unincorporated communities in Billings County, North Dakota